The Arunachal Pradesh cricket team is a cricket team that represents the state of Arunachal Pradesh in Indian domestic competitions. In July 2018, the Board of Control for Cricket in India (BCCI) named the team as one of the nine new sides that would compete in domestic tournaments for the 2018–19 season, including the Ranji Trophy and the Vijay Hazare Trophy. However, prior to the start of the tournament, the team did not have a ground to play first-class cricket on. Ahead of the 2018-19 season, Gursharan Singh was appointed as the team's coach.

In September 2018, they won their opening fixture of the 2018–19 Vijay Hazare Trophy, beating Mizoram by four wickets. In their first season in the Vijay Hazare Trophy, they finished in seventh place in the Plate Group, with two wins and five defeats from their eight matches. One match also finished as a no result. Samarth Seth finished as the leading run-scorer, with 345 runs, and Sandeep Kumar Thakur was the leading wicket-taker for the team, with eight dismissals.

In November 2018, in their opening match of the 2018–19 Ranji Trophy, they lost to Meghalaya by seven wickets. They finished the 2018–19 tournament eighth in the table, with no wins from their eight matches.

In March 2019, Arunachal Pradesh finished seventh in Group D of the 2018–19 Syed Mushtaq Ali Trophy, with one win from their seven matches. Samarth Seth was the leading run-scorer for the team in the tournament, with 221 runs, and Akhilesh Sahani was the leading wicket-taker, with eleven dismissals.

Squad

Updated as on 17 January 2023

References

Indian first-class cricket teams
Cricket in Arunachal Pradesh
2018 establishments in Arunachal Pradesh
Cricket clubs established in 2018